Sabrina Novotná (born 2 July 2000) is a Czech handball player for Házená Kynžvart and the Czech national team.

She represented the Czech Republic at the 2020 European Women's Handball Championship.

References

2000 births
Living people
Czech female handball players
Sportspeople from Prague
Expatriate handball players
Czech expatriate sportspeople in Slovakia